The 2022–23 PlusLiga is the 87th season of the Polish Volleyball Championship, the 70th season of the highest tier domestic division in the Polish volleyball league system since its establishment in 1954, and the 23rd season as a professional league. The league is operated by the Polish Volleyball League SA.

This season is composed of 16 teams, including the Ukrainian team of Barkom Każany Lwów. The regular season is played as a round-robin tournament. Each team plays a total of 30 matches, half at home and half away. The season started on 30 September 2022 and will conclude in May 2023.

Regular season

Ranking system:
 Points
 Number of victories
 Set ratio
 Setpoint ratio
 H2H results

1st round

|}

2nd round

|}

3rd round

|}

4th round

|}

5th round

|}

6th round

|}

7th round

|}

8th round

|}

9th round

|}

10th round

|}

11th round

|}

12th round

|}

13th round

|}

14th round

|}

15th round

|}

16th round

|}

17th round

|}

18th round

|}

19th round

|}

20th round

|}

21st round

|}

22nd round

|}

23rd round

|}

24th round

|}

25th round

|}

26th round

|}

27th round

|}

28th round

|}

29th round

|}

30th round

|}

Playoffs
Quarterfinals
(to 3 victories)

Quarterfinal A

|}

Quarterfinal B

|}

Quarterfinal C

|}

Quarterfinal D

|}

Semifinals
(to 3 victories)

Semifinal A

|}

Semifinal B

|}

Finals
(to 3 victories)

|}

Placement matches

13th place
(to 2 victories)

|}

11th place
(to 2 victories)

|}

9th place
(to 2 victories)

|}

7th place
(to 2 victories)

|}

5th place
(to 2 victories)

|}

3rd place
(to 3 victories)

|}

Final standings

Squads

See also
 2022–23 CEV Champions League
 2022–23 CEV Cup

References

External links
 Official website 

PlusLiga
Poland
Plusliga
Plusliga
PlusLiga
PlusLiga
PlusLiga